Hugh Bonfoy (c. 1720 – 12 March 1762) was a naval officer and colonial governor of Newfoundland.

Naval career
Bonfoy entered the Royal Navy in 1739 and was promoted to lieutenant in 1744 and to captain in 1745. He was captain of the fourth-rate HMS Augusta and then of the third-rate HMS Berwick. He became governor of Newfoundland in 1753. The common perception on the island was the uncertainty about the loyalty of Irish Roman Catholics in Newfoundland. Bonfoy did not allow Irish Catholics to worship stating that:
"Liberty of Conscience is allowed to all Persons except Papists."

See also 
 Governors of Newfoundland
 List of people from Newfoundland and Labrador

References

External links
Biography at Government House The Governorship of Newfoundland and Labrador

Governors of Newfoundland Colony
Royal Navy officers
1720s births
1762 deaths
Year of birth uncertain
18th-century Royal Navy personnel